Sax Pax for a Sax is a collaboration album between the London Saxophonic and the blind musician, composer, and  performer Moondog.  The album was recorded in 1994 and released on November 28, 1997.  The album marks Moondog's re-emergence into the American jazz market.

Critical reception 

The album was well received by the public and peaked at number 22 on the Billboard Albums. Entertainment Weekly magazine said the album was a "hypnotic blend of jazz and classical music," and gave it a B.

The music critic David D. Duncan says that the album "sounds like a nostalgic big band on laughing gas."

Another music critic Ian Koss said that the "music on Sax Pax for a Sax is bold assertive-even at its most demure the saxophone can't help its brassy nature-powerful without losing grace." He also explains "Increasingly larger groups of saxophones interplay in melodies that weave through kettledrum pillars in a way that is equal parts Philip Glass and Paul McCartney."

A review by John Murph for "JazzTimes" said "A stargazing composer, Moondog's penchant for crafting accessible, yet utterly otherworldly melodies bridges European classical forms with American jazz sensibilities."

Track listing
 Dog Trot
 Paris
 Bird's Lament
 Sandalwood
 Tout Suite No. 1 in F Major 1 Mov. 
 Tout Suite No. 1 in F Major 2 Mov.
 Tout Suite No. 1 in F Major 3 Mov.
 D for Danny
 New Amsterdam
 Sea Horse
 Fiesta
 Novette No. 1 in D Flat Major 1 Mov.
 Novette No. 1 in D Flat Major 2 Mov.
 Novette No. 1 in D Flat Major 3 Mov.
 Single Foot
 Mother's Whistler
 Present for the Prez.
 Shakespeare City 
 Golden Fleece
 Hymn to Peace
 EEC Lied

Personnel
The album features Moondog on the bass drum, Tim Redpath and Bradley Grant on the soprano sax, Rob Buckland, Bradley Grant and Simon Haram on the alto sax, Rob Buckland, Gareth Brady, and Andy Scott on the tenor sax, Jon Rebbeck and Chris Caldwell on the baritone sax, and Will Gregory on the bass sax.  There are nine total saxophonists on this album and some songs will feature anywhere from just four of them to all nine.  There are also other instruments and musicians featured such as Danny Thompson on the contra bass, Liam Noble on the piano, and Paul Clarvis on the snare drum.

References 

1997 albums
Moondog albums
London Saxophonic albums